Ancylosis pectinatella is a species of snout moth in the genus Ancylosis. It was described by Ragonot, in 1887, and is known from Uzbekistan, Spain and Turkey.

The wingspan is about 22 mm.

References

Moths described in 1887
pectinatella
Moths of Europe
Moths of Asia